Miloš Kukolj (born 1 December 1998) is a Serbian professional footballer who plays as a forward for Inđija.

Club career

Partizan
Born in Novi Banovci, Kukolj passed FK Partizan youth school. made his professional debut for Partizan in the last fixture match of 2014–15 Serbian SuperLiga season against Borac Čačak, played on 24 May 2015. After 2015–16 season he had spent with youth team, Kukolj signed a three-year professional contract with Partizan and moved to Serbian First League side Bežanija on one-year loan closely. As he spent the first season match sitting on the bench and missed next 2 matches, loan was terminated and Kukolj returned to Partizan in last days of the summer transfer window 2016. In the winter break off-season, Kukolj was loaned to the Serbian League Belgrade side IMT, and shortly after he was nominated for the best young player of the tournament "Čukarica 2017". In summer 2017, Kukolj was loaned to Dinamo Pančevo, where he played in the Serbian League Vojvodina as a bonus player for a half-season. He also moved on loan to the Serbian First League club Budućnost Dobanovci until the end of the 2017–18 campaign.

International career
As a coach of Serbia U18 national team level, Ivan Tomić invited Kukolj into the squad in 2015. He made several matches for the team until 2016.

Career statistics

Honours
Partizan
 Serbian SuperLiga: 2014–15

References

External links
 Miloš Kukolj stats at utakmica.rs 
 
 

1998 births
Living people
People from Stara Pazova
Association football forwards
Serbian footballers
FK Partizan players
FK Bežanija players
FK Dinamo Pančevo players
FK Budućnost Dobanovci players
FK Radnički Pirot players
FK Inđija players
Serbian SuperLiga players
Serbian First League players
Serbia youth international footballers